Lawrence Lek is a multimedia artist, filmmaker, and musician based in London. His works include the films "AIDOL", "Geomancer", "Sinofuturism (1839–2046 AD)", the open world video game simulations "2065", "Europa, Mon Amour (2016 Brexit Edition)", "Unreal Estate (The Royal Academy is Yours)", and "Nøtel", an audio-visual collaboration with Kode9. Lek describes himself as a simulation artist, and uses 3D rendering technology in his work.

Born in 1982 in Frankfurt am Main, Lek is of Malaysian Chinese descent, and studied architecture at Trinity College, Cambridge, the Architectural Association and Cooper Union in New York. He is represented by Sadie Coles HQ, London.

References

External links 

 Official website
 Sadie Coles HQ Profile

1982 births
Alumni of Trinity College, Cambridge
Cooper Union alumni
German video artists
Living people